The Speaker of the Vermont House of Representatives is the Speaker  or presiding officer of the Vermont House of Representatives, the lower house of the Vermont Legislature.

The Speaker presides over sessions of the Houses, recognizes members so that they may speak, and ensures compliance with House rules for parliamentary procedure.  The Speaker also assigns members to the standing committees of the House and assigns committee chairpersons. The Speaker is second (behind the Lieutenant Governor) in the line of succession to the office of Governor of Vermont.
           
Vermont was admitted to the Union in 1791 as the fourteenth state, but its House of Representatives dates from 1778, when the Vermont Republic was created.

Vermont had a unicameral legislature until 1836, when the Governor's Council was abolished and the Vermont Senate was created.

The Speaker of the Vermont House of Representatives earned $10,080 starting in 2005. Beginning in 2007, this amount receives an annual cost of living increase.

References

 
Vermont General Assembly
Government of Vermont
Vermont
Speakers